Hsioh-Ren Wei or Wei Xueren (1899–1987) was born in Nanjing, Jiangsu.  He entered the private University of Nanking in 1918 and received a Bachelor of Science degree in 1922.

In 1925, he received a scholarship to pursue graduate studies in physics at the University of Chicago.

In 1928, upon obtaining a doctoral degree in Physics from the University of Chicago, he returned to China and became a physics professor at the Private University of Nanking as China's first nuclear-physicist.

In 1929, he became the founding dean of science at University of Nanking.

Later in his career, he served for several years as the representative of the Republic of China on the United Nations Security Council.

Republic of China politicians from Jiangsu
1899 births
1987 deaths
Permanent Representatives of the Republic of China to the United Nations
Politicians from Nanjing
University of Chicago alumni
Physicists from Jiangsu
Educators from Nanjing
Academic staff of the University of Nanking
Scientists from Nanjing